Zutulba namaqua, a genus of moths of the family Zygaenidae, are found in temperate regions. Majority of the tropical species, commonly called foresters moths, have bright prominent spots containing hydrogen cyanide for warning predators. These toxins allow the moths to have mimicry.

Species
 Zutulba namaqua (Boisduval, 1847)
 Zutulba ocellaris (Felder, 1874)

References
Zutulba at AfroMoths

Zygaeninae
Zygaenidae genera